Junshan District is one of three urban districts in Yueyang City, Hunan province, China. The district is located in the west of the city proper, on the northern shore of Dongting Lake and the southwestern bank of Yangtze River. It is bordered by Huarong County to the west, Nan County to the south, Yueyang County to the east, cross the Yangtze to the north by Jianli County of Hubei. The district has four towns and a subdistrict under its jurisdiction. the government seat is Liulinzhou.

Junshan District is named after the islet of Junshan, where is the source place of the famous Chinese tea Junshan Yinzhen. The islet of Junshan, with long history of culture resources, is rich of remains and relics, it is also one of Chinese AAAAA-rated tourist attractions.

Administrative divisions
After an adjustment of township-level administrative divisions of Junshan District on 20 November 2015, Junshan District has 1 subdistrict and four towns under its jurisdiction, they are:

One subdistrict
 Liulinzhou

Four towns
 Guangxinzhou
 Liangxinbao
 Qianlianghu
 Xushi

References

www.xzqh.org 

 
County-level divisions of Hunan
Yueyang